The Old Ship is a Grade II listed public house at 3 King Street, Richmond in the London Borough of Richmond upon Thames. It was built in the 18th century, and the architect is not known. Prior to 1725 it was known as the Six Bells: it acquired its present name in the 1780s and  has been a Young's pub since 1860.

Notes

References

External links
Official website

18th-century establishments in England
Commercial buildings completed in the 18th century
Grade II listed buildings in the London Borough of Richmond upon Thames
Grade II listed pubs in London
Pubs in the London Borough of Richmond upon Thames
Richmond, London